3-on-3 basketball was contested at the 2009 Asian Indoor Games in Ho Chi Minh City, Vietnam from 31 October to 6 November.

Medalists

Medal table

Results

Men

Elimination

Group A

Group B

Knockout round

Semifinals

Bronze medal match

Final

Women

References

 Official site

2009
basketball
2009 in 3x3 basketball
2009–10 in Asian basketball
2009–10 in Vietnamese basketball
International basketball competitions hosted by Vietnam